Piotr Tomasik (born 31 October 1987) is a Polish professional footballer who plays as a left-back for Ekstraklasa side Wisła Płock.

Career

Tomasik started his career with Przebój Wolbrom.

On 11 January 2018 he signed a three-and-a-half-year contract with Lech Poznań.

Career statistics

Club

1 One appearance in Polish Cup, five appearances in Ekstraklasa Cup.

References

External links
  
 

1987 births
Living people
Polish footballers
Association football defenders
Poland youth international footballers
Ekstraklasa players
I liga players
II liga players
Polonia Bytom players
Flota Świnoujście players
Arka Gdynia players
Podbeskidzie Bielsko-Biała players
Jagiellonia Białystok players
Lech Poznań players
Lech Poznań II players
Wisła Płock players
Footballers from Kraków
Przebój Wolbrom players